D43 may refer to:

 D43 motorway (Czech Republic)
 D43 road (Croatia)
 , a C-class light cruiser of the Royal Navy
 , a Battle-class fleet destroyer of the Royal Navy
 , a cancelled Malta-class aircraft carrier ordered for the Royal Navy
 , a W-class destroyer of the Royal Navy
 Semi-Slav Defense, a chess opening